Montauri is a municipality in the state of Rio Grande do Sul, Brazil. As of 2020, it has a population of 1,441 people.

Demographics

Curiously, it is the only Brazilian town where the entire population reported to be White, according to the 2000 census. The town has its origin from a group of Italian immigrants who settled in the region in 1904.

References

See also
List of municipalities in Rio Grande do Sul

Municipalities in Rio Grande do Sul